Nina Louise Warhurst (born October 1980) is an English journalist, newsreader, television presenter and actress. She is currently a business and consumer presenter on BBC Breakfast.

Early life and education
Nina Louise Warhurst was born in October 1980 in Sale, Greater Manchester. She later moved to Salford as a teenager.

Warhurst went to the catholic Loreto Grammar School in Altrincham, and to St Bede's College, Manchester where she took A-levels in English Literature, History and Politics. At the University of Edinburgh she studied History and Politics, graduating with a first-class honours MA degree in 2004, and later studied Broadcast journalism at the University of Westminster, graduating with a PG Dip. in 2005.

Career
Warhurst begin her on-screen career in an acting role in the Christmas special of Casualty in 1997, Heartbeat in 1998, and Butterfly Collectors in 1999. Warhurst began her broadcasting career on Russia Today in Moscow. In April 2007, Warhurst joined the Guardian's regional television channel Channel M presenting on Channel M Breakfast. In 2009, she moved to Channel M's weekday news programme Channel M Today, after cutbacks at station required the cancelation of Channel M Breakfast.

In 2010, Warhurst joined BBC East Midlands regional news presenting East Midlands Today. Later in 2010, she joined BBC North West regional news presenting BBC North West Tonight and Sunday Politics North West. In June 2014, she covered the 2014 FIFA World Cup in Brazil for BBC Sport. In September 2016, Warhurst was appointed political editor at BBC North West.

In 2018, Warhurst begin reporting for BBC Breakfast on a freelance basis, and became a relief presenter when regular hosts were unavailable. In October 2020, she was appointed as BBC Breakfasts main business presenter, succeeding Steph McGovern.

Awards
In 2017, Warhurst won a Royal Television Society award for "Best Regional Journalist" for her work on BBC North West Tonight and Sunday Politics North West.

References

External links
 

1980 births
Alumni of the University of Edinburgh
BBC newsreaders and journalists
BBC North West newsreaders and journalists
BBC sports presenters and reporters
British business and financial journalists
English television presenters
Living people
People educated at St Bede's College, Manchester
People from Sale, Greater Manchester